The Wild Cow Prairie Cemetery is located in Sumter County, Florida near Bushnell, Florida. It was listed on the National Register of Historic Places in 2021.

A 2020 study using ground-penetrating radar determined presence of 16 marked and 28 unmarked graves.  It includes burials of veterans, of county commissioners and possibly of former slaves.

While its address is 5822 County Road 673, it is located along the partially paved frontage road on the southeast side of the embankment for CR 673 and Exit 309 off of Interstate 75, within part of the Withlacoochee State Forest in Saint Catherine, Florida.

References

External links
Save the Wild Cow Prairie Cemetery, YouTube video, March 12, 2020
Wild Cow Prairie Cemetery, at Find-a-grave
Wild Cow Prairie Cemetery (Florida Division of Historic Resources)

Cemeteries in Florida
National Register of Historic Places in Sumter County, Florida